Thomas Richard Donald Gibson (born 12 May 1929) is an English former footballer who played at right half in the Football League for Manchester United, Sheffield Wednesday and Leyton Orient.

Born in Manchester, Gibson joined Manchester United in 1946 as an amateur, turned professional the following year, and made his first-team debut in the First Division on 26 August 1950 against Bolton Wanderers. In the 1952–53 season, he lost his regular first-team place to Johnny Carey, who was moved to right half-back after Tommy McNulty was introduced at right back. He left United for Sheffield Wednesday in 1955 on a £8,000 transfer, after making 115 appearances without scoring. He later moved to Leyton Orient.

Gibson is the son-in-law of former Manchester United manager Sir Matt Busby, having been married to his daughter Sheena for 59 years until her death in May 2015 at the age of 78. They had three daughters.

References

External links
 

1929 births
Living people
Footballers from Manchester
English footballers
Association football wing halves
Manchester United F.C. players
Sheffield Wednesday F.C. players
Leyton Orient F.C. players
English Football League players